Myanmar International Fashion Week is an annual fashion week held in Yangon, Myanmar. It is the country's largest fashion display event and organized by John Lwin. The Fashion Week is intended for national fashion models and designers to display their talents. The first event was held in 2012.

Celebrated dates and location
Myanmar International Fashion Week 2012, run from November 16 to 18, at Junction Square, Yangon.
Not celebrated in 2013.
Myanmar International Fashion Week 2014, run from February 7 to 9, at Junction Square, Yangon.
Myanmar International Fashion Week 2015, run from February 6 to 8, at Dagon City 1, Yangon.

Myanmar International Fashion Week 2016, run from October 7 to 9, at Hexagon Complex, Shwe Htut Tin Compound in Yangon.
Myanmar International Fashion Week 2017, run from December 8 to 10, at the Hexagon Complex, Shwe Htut Tin Compound in Yangon.
Myanmar International Fashion Week 2018, run from December 7 to 9, at the Hexagon Complex, Shwe Htut Tin Compound in Yangon.
Myanmar International Fashion Week 2019 took place at the Central Boulevard, Yangon from 20 to 22 December.

References

External links

Fashion events in Myanmar
Annual events in Asia
Fashion weeks
Recurring events established in 2012
2012 establishments in Myanmar